The District of Columbia Department of Corrections (DCDC) is a correctional agency responsible for the adult jails and other adult correctional institutions for the District of Columbia, in the United States. DCDC runs the D.C. Jail.

History
The DOC was first established as an agency in 1946, when the District Jail (built 1872) was combined with the Lorton Correctional Complex.

In 1999 the DCDC was paying the Virginia Department of Corrections to house 69 prisoners at the Red Onion State Prison.

Operations
For about ninety years, the Lorton Correctional Complex in rural Fairfax County, Virginia, about 20 miles south of Washington, served as the District of Columbia's prison. The National Capital Revitalization and Self-Government Improvement Act of 1997 required the DC Department of Corrections to transfer the sentenced felon population formerly housed at Lorton to the Federal Bureau of Prisons (BOP), and the Lorton facility shut down in 2001. The Lorton complex was handed over to the General Services Administration (GSA), which manages property for the federal government, which in turn gave the property to Fairfax County.

Facilities
The DOC operates the Central Detention Facility (D.C. Jail), at 1901 D Street Southeast. The jail opened in 1976.

In 1985, a federal judge in the case of Campbell v. McGruder, a lawsuit filed against the District of Columbia for unconstitutional jail conditions, set a population cap of 1,674 inmates for the D.C. Jail. This judicially imposed cap was lifted in 2002, after seventeen years. In 2007, DOC administrators set the jail's population capacity at 2,164.

The D.C. Jail houses only adult males. It holds inmates detained while awaiting trial; inmates convicted of misdemeanors; and convicted felons awaiting transfer to the Federal Bureau of Prisons.

It consists of five separate buildings that appear like one large building. It is located adjacent to the D.C. Jail. It houses male prisoners, female prisoners, and juveniles charged as adults. (Juveniles males charged as adults formerly were housed at the D.C. Jail, but this practice was discontinued.) The CTF is operated by a private contractor, the Corrections Corporation of America, under a twenty-year contract with the District, entered into in March 1997.

The DOC contracts with three privately owned and operated halfway houses: Extended House, Inc., Fairview and Hope Village. The U.S. District Court for the District of Columbia and the Superior Court of the District of Columbia sometimes use the halfway houses as an alternative to incarceration.

Juveniles who are not charged as adults are not in DOC custody, instead going to facilities operated by the Department of Youth Rehabilitation Services.

For fiscal year 2015, DOC reported having 939 full-time employees.

Notable inmates
Central Detention Facility

 Rayful Edmond charged with various drug crimes, and charged with running a Continuing Criminal Enterprise involving at least 150 kilograms of cocaine and at least 1.5 kilograms of cocaine base "
 Barry Freundel, the "peeping rabbi," convicted on 52 counts of voyeurism.
 Ingmar Guandique, suspect in the murder of Chandra Levy
Andre Clinkscale and William McCorkle for the May 2008 murders of Duane Hough, Johnny Jeter, and Anthony Mincey,

See also

List of law enforcement agencies in the District of Columbia

References

External links
Official website
 November 4, 2021 DC DOC facility inspection report, Office of Congresswoman Marjorie Taylor Greene (GA-14)

Law enforcement agencies of the District of Columbia
State corrections departments of the United States